Amnon Linn (29 March 1924 – 21 July 2016) was an Israeli politician.

Biography
Linn was born in Mishmar HaEmek to Hava and David (Dodia) Linn. He became a member of the Hashomer Hatzair youth movement in 1940, and in 1942 joined the Palmach, fighting in Haifa. He met his wife, Ruth Hushi, daughter of Abba Hushi in 1945, and married her later that same year. He has two sons - Shai and Ran, and one daughter - Orna.

Linn joined Mapai, the ruling party, in 1951, and was appointed director of the Arab Department  of the party in the north of the country, a job he held until 1965 when he became national Director of the Arab Department. In the same year Mapai and Ahdut HaAvoda merged to form the Alignment.

In the 1965 elections he narrowly missed out on winning a seat in the Knesset; he was placed 48th on the Alignment's list, but the party won only 45 seats. However, following the resignation of two Alignment MKs and the death of Minister of Police Bechor-Shalom Sheetrit, Linn entered the Knesset in 1967. However, he lost his seat in the 1969 elections.

Linn returned to the Knesset after the 1973 election, this time as a member of Likud. He was re-elected in 1977 and 1981, but in 1982, along with most other members of the Movement for Haifa and the North (which he had founded in 1977), he defected back to the Alignment. He was re-elected in 1984 as an Alignment MK and chaired the Subcommittee for the Civil Guard in Judea and Samaria (the West Bank), but lost his seat in 1988.

In 1978 he was a candidate in the Haifa mayoral election, finishing a distant second behind Aryeh Gur'el.

References

Bibliography
Stormy Skies - Jews and Arabs in Israel (1999)

External links

1924 births
Hashomer Hatzair members
Palmach members
2016 deaths
Likud politicians
Mapai politicians
Alignment (Israel) politicians
Members of the 6th Knesset (1965–1969)
Members of the 8th Knesset (1974–1977)
Members of the 9th Knesset (1977–1981)
Members of the 10th Knesset (1981–1984)
Members of the 11th Knesset (1984–1988)
La'am politicians